Mexicanos, al grito de guerra (English: Mexicans, to the Cry of War) is a 1943 historical drama movie produced in Mexico starring Pedro Infante. The main story revolves around a soldier, a woman, love and an impending war.

Plot 
The film opens in the mid 1860s and Napoleon III (Sala) is gearing up towards an invasion of Mexico by French forces, although he’s not completely sure where it is. General Almonte informs him that they will have to cross the Atlantic Ocean to get there. 
He doesn’t feel that he is the right person to do that since his poetry is more romantic and not patriotic. 
Lt. Luis Sandoval (Infante), who is a trumpet player, suggests that Spaniard Jaime Nuno (Carrasco) compose the music to the national anthem, however Nuno feels he is the least qualified, and counters that the lyrics haven’t been written yet.

Lupe locks Bocanegra in a room and refuses to let him out until he’s written the lyrics to the national anthem, but he insists he will not write it. After he sees several items in the room that instill patriotism, he finally sits down to attempt to write. Days later he slips the manuscript under the door, and Lupe and her father agree to let him out. Nuno receives a copy of Bocanegra’s lyrics and is inspired to compose the music.
Luis meets and falls in love with Esther Dubois (Montes) who is the daughter of the French ambassador, Count Dubois of Saligny. Esther and her friends plan to go to the Paseo de las Cadenas that evening. By chance, Luis and his friend see Esther at the park and he sings to her. Her friend tosses a coin to Luis, who tries to give it back but the man insists he keep it. Luis accepts but regrets that he can’t give the man change, and insinuates that the man needs it more than Luis does. 

President Santa Anna (Quiroz) needs to raise funds to cover the costs of the additional military personnel, he imposes a tax on the number of windows and doors that face the street, which prompts city residents to seal windows and roos with brick, to reduce the amount of taxes they will have to pay. 

In one battle where the Mexican forces were near the brink of defeat Luis decides to grab a trumpet and play the song "Mexicanos, al grito de guerra", the national anthem of Mexico. Upon hearing it played, the Mexican soldiers rally and overcome the French forces. However, Luis is shot and dies in the end at the same time his love escapes imprisonment.

Cast list 

 Pedro Infante - Lt. Luis Sandoval
 Lina Montes - Esther Dubois
 Miguel Arenas - Conde Dubois de Saligny
 Miguel Ángel Ferriz - Gen. Ignacio Zaragoza
 Miguel Inclán - President Benito Juárez
 Armando Soto La Marina - Pastelero (as Chicote)
 Salvador Carrasco - Jaime Nunó
 Margarita Cortés - Lupe
 Carlos Riquelme - Francisco González Bocanegra
 Francisco Jambrina - Gen. Juan Prim
 Manuel Arvide - Gen. Lorencez
 Eduardo Arozamena
 Guillermo Nuñez K.
 Salvador Quiroz - Antonio López de Santa Anna
 Arturo Soto Rangel - Sandoval, Papá de Luis
 Roberto Corell
 Arturo Soto Rangel - Sandoval, Papá de Luis
 Ramón G. Larrea - Gen. Jurien
 José Goula - Mr. Wyckie
 Teresa Vega
 Pedro Elviro - Lombardini (as Pitouto)
 Angel T. Sala
 Ramon Larrea
 Max Langler
 Manuel Noriega Ruiz (as Manuel Noriega)
 José Soula
 Ignacio Peon
 Ricardo Carti - Gen. Almonte
 Armando Gutierrez

References

External links

1943 films
1940s Spanish-language films
Mexican black-and-white films
1940s war drama films
Second French intervention in Mexico films
1940s historical drama films
Mexican historical drama films
Mexican war drama films
1943 drama films
1940s Mexican films